Sant Ravidas Ghat is the southernmost and largest ghat in Varanasi. To most visitors to Varanasi, it is known for being an important religious place for Ravidasis with a 25 acres park known as Sant Ravidas Smarak Park.

History
Ravidas Ghat was announced for the creation in February 2008, during 2008 Golden Palki Shobha Yatra at Sant Ravidas temple on the saint's 631st birth and inaugurated in 2009 by Chief Minister Mayawati.

Tourism and popular culture
Sant Ravidas Ghat is nearly 13 minutes drive from Shri Guru Ravidass Janam Asthan, Varanasi. 

The place is well known for religious tourism by devotees of Guru Ravidas.

Sant Ravidas Ghat is one of ghats often visited for recreation and during festivals like Dev Deepawali and Ganga Mahotsav. 

There is a proposed helium balloon ride facility is at Sant Ravidas Ghat as a tourist attraction.

See also
Shri Guru Ravidass Janam Asthan
Shri Guru Ravidas Gurughar

References

External links
Mayawati's speech on Sant Ravidas Ghat

Ghats in Varanasi